Wisteria brachybotrys, the silky wisteria, is a species of flowering plant in the pea family Fabaceae from Japan. Some older references believed it to be of garden origin. It is certainly very widely cultivated in its native Japan, with the white flowered cultivars more widely grown than the pale violet cultivars. It is in fact native to western parts of Honshu and throughout Shikoku and Kyushu, growing in mountain forests and woods from 100 to 900m. It is not at all clear why it is less popular in the west than in Japan.

The Greek specific epithet brachybotrys means “short clusters”. 

The scented flowers, borne in late spring and early summer, are pale violet or white with a yellow blotch at the base. They are followed by felted green seedpods containing pea-like seeds. These are reported to be toxic if ingested in quantity. 

Like its more famous cousins, Wisteria sinensis (Chinese wisteria) and Wisteria floribunda (Japanese wisteria), it requires support when grown as an ornamental. It may be trained up a tree, a wall or a pergola. It may also be trained as a half-standard tree. It is hardy down to  but needs a sheltered position in sun or partial shade, and reliably moist soil.

The following cultivars have gained the Royal Horticultural Society’s Award of Garden Merit:-  
’Okayama’ 
’Showa-beni’ 
Wisteria brachybotrys f. albiflora 'Shiro-kapitan'

Gallery

References

brachybotrys
Flora of Japan
Vines
Garden plants of Asia